The Ancient Diocese of Vaison (Lat. dioecesis Vasionensis) was a Roman Catholic diocese in France, suppressed in 1801, with its territory transferred to the diocese of Avignon. It had been one of nine dioceses in the ecclesiastical province presided over by the archbishop of Arles, but a later reorganization placed Vasio under the archbishop of Avignon. Jurisdiction inside the diocese was shared between the bishop and the Comte de Provence, higher justice and the castle belonging to the Comte, and civil justice and all other rights belonging to the bishop. The cathedral was served by a chapter which had four dignities: the provost (praepositus), the archdeacon, the sacristan, and the precentor. There were also six canons, each of whom had a prebend attached to his office.

History

The oldest known bishop of the See is Daphnus, who assisted at the Council of Arles (314).

Others were St. Quinidius (Quenin, 556-79), who resisted the claims of the patrician Mummolus, conqueror of the Lombards; Joseph-Marie de Suares (1633–66), who died in Rome in 1677 while filling the office of Custode of the Vatican Library and Vicar of the Basilica of St. Peter, and who left numerous works.

St. Rusticala (551–628) was abbess of the monastery of St. Caesarius at Arles.

William Chisholme (II), former bishop of Dunblane, became bishop of Vaison-la-Romaine in 1566 or 1569.

Two councils which dealt with ecclesiastical discipline were held at Vaison in 442 and 529, the latter a provincial council under the presidency of Caesarius of Arles.

The bishopric was suppressed as part of the Napoleonic Concordat of 1801, between Consul Bonaparte and Pope Pius VII, and the territory of Vaison was incorporated into the diocese of Avignon and the diocese of Valence. In 2009 the title of Vasio was revived as a titular See.

Bishops

To 1000

Dafnus (Daphnus, Dammas) 314-347
Emilien 347-367
Concordius 367-419
Julian 419-439
Auspicius 439-450
Fonteïus 450-483
Donidius 483-506
Papolus 506-511
Etilius 511-517
Gemellus 517-524
Eripius 524
Alethius 524-541
Theodosius 541-556
Saint Quenin 556-575
Saint Barse 575-581
Artemius 581-644?
Pétronius Aredius 644
Vacant for 169 years
Jean I 813-853
Simplicius 853-855
Elias (Hélie) 855-911
Umbert I 911-933
Ripert I 933-982
Amalric I 982-983
Umbert II 983-996
Benedictus (Benoît I) 996-1003 or 1000

1000 to 1300

Imbert 1000?-1003?
Almerade 1003-1005
Umbert III 1005-1007
Pierre I 1007-1009
Pierre de Mirabel 1009-1059
Benoît II 1059-1060
Pierre III 1060-1103
Raimbaud I 1103-1107
Rostang 1107-1142
Bérenger de Mornas 1142-1178
Bertrand de Lambesc 1178-1185
Bérenger de Reilhane 1185-1190
Guillaume de Laudun 1190-1193
Raimbaud de Flotte 1193-1212
Ripert de Flotte 1212-1241
Guy I 1241-1250
Faraud 1250-1271
Giraud de Libra 1271-1279
Bertrand II 1279-1280
Giraud II 1280-1296
Raimond de Beaumont 1296-1332

1300 to 1500

Jean II 1332-1333
Bertrand III 1333-1335
Gocio (Gozzio, Gothius) de Bataille 1335–1336, cardinal
Ratier 1336-1341
Pierre de Casa Patriarche 1341-1348
Pierre de Beret 1348-1356
Guy de Perpignan 
Laurent d'Albiac 1356-1362
Jean Maurel 1362-1370
Pierre Boyer 1370-1376
Eblon de Meder 1376-1380
Raimond de Bonne (Dominican) 1380-1395
Radulph 1395-1406
Guillaume de Pesserat 1406-1412
Hugues de Theissiac 1409-1445
Pons de Sade 1445-1473
Jean de Montmirail 1473-1479
Amauric II 1479-1482
Odon Alziassi 1482-1483
Roland 1483-1485
Benoit de Paganottis, O.P. 1485-1523

From 1500

Jérôme Sclede 1523-1533
Thomas Cortés 1533-1544
Jacques Cortès Patriarche 1544-1566
William Chisholm (II) 1566-1585
William Chisholm (III) 1585-1629 (nephew of the preceding)
Michel d'Almeras 1629-1633
Joseph Marie de Suarès 1633-1666
Charles Joseph de Suarès 1666-1671
Louis Alphonse de Suarès 1671-1685
François Genet 1685-1703
Joseph François Gualtéri 1703-1725
Joseph Louis de Cohorne de la Palun 1725-1748
Paul de Sallières de Fausseran 1748-1758
Charles François de Pélissier de St Ferréol 1758-1786
Etienne André Fallot de Beaumont 1786-1790

See also 
 Catholic Church in France
 List of Catholic dioceses in France

References

Bibliography

Reference works
 p. 517.
 (in Latin) p. 263.
 (in Latin) p. 244.
 p. 327.
 p. 360.
 pp. 405–406.
 p. 433.

Studies

 second edition (in French) pp. 262–263.

 
Vaison
1801 disestablishments in France